Huka-huka is a Brazilian folk wrestling style of the indigenous people of Xingu, in the state of Mato Grosso. It is performed as a ritual fight during the ceremony of Kuarup.

Rules
Huka-huka starts with the participants on their knees. It begins when the owner of the fight, a male chief, walks to the center of the arena and calls his opponents by name. The fighters kneel rotating clockwise in a circle facing the opponent, until they look at each other and cling, trying to lift the opponent and knock him to the ground The fight is performed by either men and women.

Huka huka as a martial art
Huka huka is being introduced, experimentally, in the formation of São Paulo State Military Police. The fight is also being studied by mixed martial arts practitioners.

References

External links
Huka-huka

Brazilian martial arts
Combat sports
Indigenous sports and games of the Americas
Folk wrestling styles
Indigenous culture of the Amazon
Xingu peoples